Blauenstein is a castle fort on a rocky outcrop north of Kleinlützel, Switzerland.

The castle was probably built in the thirteenth century and destroyed in 1411 by the forces of Basel during the Neuenstein War. There are only a few walls remaining today. The castle suffered further damage during the 1356 Basel earthquake.

As it was at the junction of important Roman pass on Blauenbergkette, the city of Kleinlützel proposes Roman origins for the castle.

One description of the castle was given as follows, from a book published in 1841: "...the three castles of Blauenstein, Bechburg, and Falkenstein. In ancient times they were inhabited by three powerful barons, who were all warriors, and combined together to keep the passes, that here lead in different directions into Switzerland, completely in their own hands. They would not suffer any persons, whatever might be their station, to pass without paying a toll, which they chose to levy on travellers and their goods, according to their own pleasure. They were, in fact, no better than leaders of banditti; for they spared no one, and their imposts were more particularly levied on the merchants, who brought their goods by this route from far distant lands. If any one offered remonstrance or resistance, he was imprisoned without hope of escape; and, that no person should elude their tyranny, they kept the gates in the walls they had raised at the foot of the rocks, across the narrow passes, constantly closed, so that by day or by night not a soul could pass without their permission.”

References 

Ruined castles in Switzerland